Mo Chang-min (Hangul: 모창민, Hanja: 牟唱民) (born May 8, 1985 in Gwangju) is an infielder who plays for the NC Dinos in the Korea Baseball Organization League. He bats and throws right-handed.

Amateur career 
After graduating from Gwangju Jaeil High School, Mo went undrafted in the 2005 KBO Amateur Draft. Instead, he entered Sungkyunkwan University to play college baseball. While in college, Mo was regarded as the best collegiate five-tool player, winning numerous home run and stolen base titles. In July 2006, as a junior at Sungkyunkwan University, Mo got his first call-up to the South Korea national baseball team and competed in the team's three friendly baseball matches against the USA national baseball team in Durham, North Carolina, as a cleanup hitter. He hit a two-RBI single off future Cy Young Award winner Jake Arrieta in Game 3 but struggled at the plate during the series, going 1-for-10.

Notable international careers

Professional career 
Mo was selected by the SK Wyverns with the 10th overall pick of the  KBO Draft. After the Draft, Wyverns manager Kim Sung-Keun indicated an expectation that Mo would resume his role as the team's top base-stealing slugger entering the 2008 season. The team gave Mo consistent chances during the season when he appeared in 91 games. However, Mo finished his rookie season with a disappointing .223 batting average, 1 home run, 20 RBI and 10 stolen bases.

In  Mo posted slightly better offensive stats, batting .237 and smacking 4 home runs in 92 games. In , however, Mo was demoted to the Wyverns' second-tier team, spending half of the 2010 season in the Futures League. He hit only .183 with 2 RBI through the 2010 season.

After the  season, Mo left the Wyverns to serve a two-year mandatory military commitment. In October , Mo competed for the South Korean national team in the 2011 Baseball World Cup where he batted .302 and smacked 2 home runs with 6 RBI, appearing in all 12 games as a starting third baseman. He made the tourney All-Star team at third base, beating out Michel Enríquez and Javier Castillo.

Mo was drafted by the NC Dinos in the 2013 KBO Expansion Draft. In his first year with the Dinos, he batted .276 with 12 home runs and 51 RBIs. In the 2014 season, Mo batted .263, with career highs in home runs (16), RBI (72) and hits (110).

Prior to the 2016 season, Mo sustained a knee injury. In early March, he underwent arthroscopic surgery to repair a torn meniscus, and missed the first half of the season. He returned from injury in July, and finished the season with a .319 batting average in 133 at-bats.

Mo bounced back in the 2017 season, establishing career-highs in numerous offensive categories, including hits (148), doubles (25), home runs (17), RBIs (90), total bases (230), and walks (39).

Notable international careers

External links 
 Korea Baseball Organization career statistics from Koreabaseball.com

NC Dinos players
SSG Landers players
KBO League infielders
South Korean baseball players
Sungkyunkwan University alumni
1985 births
Living people
Mo clan of Hampyeong
Sportspeople from Gwangju